On Repeat may refer to: 
 "On Repeat" (Hillsong United song), 2022
 "On Repeat", a song by LCD Soundsystem from LCD Soundsystem, 2005
 "On Repeat", a song by Keke Wyatt from Rated Love, 2016